The Louis Vangindertahlen House is a historic house located in Brussels, Wisconsin. It was added to the State and the National Register of Historic Places in 2004.

References

Houses on the National Register of Historic Places in Wisconsin
National Register of Historic Places in Door County, Wisconsin
Houses in Door County, Wisconsin
Late 19th and Early 20th Century American Movements architecture
Concrete buildings and structures
Houses completed in 1921